Calosoma discors is a species of ground beetle in the subfamily Carabinae. It was described by John Lawrence LeConte in 1857.

References

discors
Beetles described in 1857